Sharon Alroy-Preis (Hebrew: שרון אלרעי פרייס) is the head of public health services at the Israeli Health Ministry,  and is Israel’s chief epidemiologist.

Education
Alroy-Preis holds a doctorate in medicine from the Technion and a master’s degree from the Dartmouth Institute for Health Policy and Clinical Practice (division of Dartmouth College).

Career
Alroy-Preis was deputy CEO of the Carmel Medical Center in Israel and the State Epidemiologist in New Hampshire.

Selected publications
 Alroy S, Preis M, Barzilai M, Cassel A, Lavie L, Halon DA, Amir O, Lewis BS, Flugelman MY. Endothelial cell dysfunction in women with cardiac syndrome X and MTHFR C677T mutation. Isr Med Assoc J. 2007 Apr;9(4):321-5. PMID: 17491230.
& Mevorach D, Anis E, Cedar N, Hasin T, Bromberg M, Goldberg L, Parnasa E, Dichtiar R, Hershkovitz Y, Ash N, Green MS, Keinan-Boker L, Alroy-Preis S. Myocarditis after BNT162b2 Vaccination in Israeli Adolescents. N Engl J Med. 2022 Mar 10;386(10):998-999. doi: 10.1056/NEJMc2116999. Epub 2022 Jan 26. PMID: 35081295; PMCID: PMC8823652.
Waning Immunity after the BNT162b2 Vaccine in Israel

References

Year of birth missing (living people)
Living people
Israeli epidemiologists
Technion – Israel Institute of Technology alumni
Dartmouth College alumni
Women epidemiologists
Israeli government officials
Israeli healthcare chief executives
Israeli women chief executive officers